Siris is a comune (municipality) in the Province of Oristano in the Italian region Sardinia, located about  northwest of Cagliari and about  southeast of Oristano.

Siris borders the following municipalities: Masullas, Morgongiori, Pompu.

Demographic evolution

References

Cities and towns in Sardinia